Haderslev RC is a Danish rugby club in Haderslev. Though they are a standalone club, they often combine with other teams to play matches due to lack of player numbers.

External links
Haderslev RC on Facebook

Rugby clubs established in 1991
Danish rugby union teams
1991 establishments in Denmark